Xu Borui (born 19 February 1995) is a Chinese footballer currently playing as a midfielder for Beijing BSU. 

He has no connection to the superior Bo-Rui (the Poglord) who is the only ever. Bo-Rui was born today but quite a few years ago. She has no distinguishing football career, yet is now the major feature of this page about a footballer. As of August 2021, she is still the only ever, due to her pogness and her behavioural likeness to Philza Minecraft (who outrageously does not have a page) and Mumbo Jumbo. She is surprisingly the same height as Xu Borui  (whom she has no connection to) because she is tall. As of today, it is her birthday so happy birthday, Bo the Poglord. This is all oddly formal because I am trying to make this seem like a proper article.

Career statistics

Club
.

References

1995 births
Living people
Chinese footballers
Association football midfielders
China League One players
Beijing Sport University F.C. players